The Truth About Love may refer to:

 The Truth About Love (film), 2004
 The Truth About Love (Lemar album), 2006
 The Truth About Love (Pink album), 2012
 The Truth About Love Tour, the sixth concert tour by Pink

See also
Don't Tell Me the Truth About Love, short story collection by British author Dan Rhodes
"O Tell Me the Truth About Love", a poem by W. H. Auden; set to music by Benjamin Britten as one of his Cabaret Songs